The Stardust Best Supporting Actor Award is chosen by the readers of the annual Stardust magazine. The award honours a star that has made an impact with their acting and represents new talent.

Here is a list of the award winners and the films for which they won.

References

See also 
 Stardust Awards
 Bollywood
 Cinema of India

Stardust Awards